Federated Wireless is an American-based wireless communications company headquartered in Arlington County, Virginia. The company is "commercializing CBRS spectrum for 4G and 5G wireless systems".

Federated was founded in 2012 by Jeffrey H. Reed, Charles Clancy, Robert McGwier and Joseph Mitola, who subsequently co-applied for a number of patents relating to the operation of shared spectrum for wireless networks. The company was created to develop technology to enable the operation of Citizens Broadband Radio Service (CBRS), and is "backed by communications industry stalwarts" such as Charter Communications, American Tower Corporation and Arris. Iyad Tarazi, who had left an executive position at Sprint Corporation in a March 2014 restructuring, joined the company as CEO in September 2014. Federated Wireless, a subsidiary of Allied Minds, provides innovative cloud-based wireless infrastructure solutions to extend the access of carrier networks.

In late 2013, Federated Wireless was one of four organizations named as new members by the Wireless Innovation Forum, along with Google, Nordia Soft and the research organization Idaho National Laboratory. The company also supports implementation of a "fully functional [Spectrum Access System] (SAS), capable of managing the proposed three-tier framework" for CBRS spectrum sharing.

In August 2016, Federated Wireless, along with Google, Nokia, Intel, Qualcomm and Ruckus Wireless, launched the CBRS Alliance to "foster the ecosystem" around the 3.5 GHz band. Federated Wireless is on the CBRS Alliance board of directors, with director Sarosh Vesuna as the organization's treasurer.  The company has worked closely with others in the broadband communications space "to develop standards and equipment to bring the idea to life". In September 2017, Federated Wireless launched its Spectrum Controller. In April 2018, Verizon Communications announced that it was working with companies including Federated "on system testing across the 3.5GHz CBRS spectrum band". In May 2018, Verizon Communications announced the deployment of CBRS in its commercial network in Florida with Federated Wireless, Ericsson and Qualcomm.

See also
Federal Communications Commission
Wireless security
Wireless WAN
Wireless access point

References

External links

 
 Official Web Page of Federated Wireless

Wireless
Wireless networking
American companies established in 2012
Companies based in Virginia
2012 establishments in Virginia